Teulisna reflexa is a moth in the family Erebidae. It was described by Jeremy Daniel Holloway in 2001. It is found on Borneo. The habitat consists of montane areas.

The length of the forewings is about 12 mm.

References

Moths described in 2001
reflexa